Eric Wallin (born 10 december 1960) is a sailor from Göteborg, Sweden, who represented his country at the 1984 Summer Olympics in Los Angeles, United States as crew member in the Soling. With helmsman Magnus Grävare and fellow crew member Martin Grävare they took the 10th place.

References

Living people
1960 births
Sailors at the 1984 Summer Olympics – Soling
Olympic sailors of Sweden
Swedish male sailors (sport)
Sportspeople from Gothenburg